Daniel Bonevac is an American philosopher born in Pittsburgh. He is professor of philosophy at the University of Texas at Austin. He has degrees in philosophy from Haverford College, and the University of Pittsburgh. His areas of interest are metaphysics, philosophical logic, ethics, and Eastern philosophy. In autumn 2016, Bonevac joined 145 other scholars and writers in declaring support for Donald Trump for president. He has posted hundreds of philosophy videos on his YouTube channel.

Books 
Reduction in the Abstract Sciences (1982)
 Deduction (1987, 2002) 
 The Art and Science of Logic (1990) 
 Today's Moral Issues (1992, 7th ed. 2012) 
 Understanding Non-Western Philosophy: Introductory Readings (1993)
 Beyond the Western Tradition: Readings in Moral and Political Philosophy (1992)
Simple Logic (1999, 2001) 
Worldly Wisdom (2001)
An Introduction to World Philosophy (2009)

References

External links 
utdirect.utexas.edu
[YouTube channel: https://www.youtube.com/user/PhiloofAlexandria/featured]

Philosophers of mathematics
Philosophers of science
Protestant philosophers
American logicians
Living people
Year of birth missing (living people)